This is a list of candidates for the 1887 New South Wales colonial election. The election was held from 4 February to 26 February 1887.

This was the first election at which there were recognisable political parties in New South Wales: the Free Trade Party of Premier Sir Henry Parkes, and the Protectionist Party. In general, candidates classified as independent protectionists were protectionists who supported Parkes, while independent free traders were free traders who opposed him.

Retiring Members
Bourke MLAs Russell Barton and William Sawers had resigned on 2 December 1886 and a poll held, however parliament was dissolved before the writ was returned.

Ezekiel Baker MLA (Carcoar)
Edmund Barton MLA (East Sydney) – appointed to Legislative Council
Alexander Bolton MLA (Murrumbidgee)
Michael Burke MLA (Tamworth)
Robert Butcher MLA (Paddington)
Charles Collins MLA (Namoi)
Walter Coonan MLA (Forbes)
John Cramsie MLA (Balranald)
Mark Hammond MLA (Canterbury)
Patrick Hogan MLA (Richmond)
Frederick Humphery MLA (Shoalhaven)
Sir Patrick Jennings MLA (Bogan)
William Judd MLA (Canterbury)
Lewis Lloyd MLA (West Macquarie)
Joseph Olliffe MLA (South Sydney)
William Proctor MLA (New England)
Edward Quin MLA (Wentworth)
Septimus Stephen MLA (Canterbury)
Francis Tait MLA (Argyle)
Robert White MLA (Gloucester)
Thomas Williamson MLA (Redfern)
Robert Wisdom MLA (Morpeth)

Legislative Assembly
Sitting members are shown in bold text. Successful candidates are highlighted in the relevant colour and marked with an asterisk (*).

Electorates are arranged chronologically from the day the poll was held. Because of the sequence of polling, some sitting members who were defeated in their constituencies were then able to contest other constituencies later in the polling period. On the second occasion, these members are shown in italic text.

See also
 Members of the New South Wales Legislative Assembly, 1887–1889

References

1887